Claytor Lake in Pulaski County, Virginia, is a ,  reservoir on the New River, created for an Appalachian Power Company hydroelectric project. It is named for W. Graham Claytor, Sr. (1886–1971) of Roanoke, Virginia, a vice president of Appalachian Power who had supervised the construction of the Claytor Dam, which created the lake.

Three miles of Claytor Lake's shoreline is bordered by Virginia's Claytor Lake State Park.

History 
In 1910, the New River Power Company began acquiring land on the New River south of Radford, Virginia for the impoundment for several hydroelectric dam projects. By 1925, these projects had been combined, and control of the project passed to Appalachian Power Company. The construction of Development No. 6, later called the Claytor Dam, began in 1937 and was completed in 1939.  By the Spring of 1940, the New River was fully impounded, and Claytor Lake was formed.

Claytor Dam is a concrete gravity dam, impounding an estimated storage capacity of 225,000 acre-feet. The plant is the largest of the power company's 12 hydroelectric plants, with a total generating capacity of 75 megawatts.

In early 1944, the people of the surrounding area expressed an interest in the establishment of a state park on the new lake. The idea continued to grow, and in 1946 private citizens and businesses from Pulaski, Radford and Blacksburg raised the money needed to purchase  from Appalachian Power. This land was given to the state to be developed as Claytor Lake State Park.

Friends of Claytor Lake 
Friends of Claytor Lake is a non-profit organization that is dedicated to the environmental conservation of Claytor Lake. They operate a clean-up crew to remove debris from Claytor Lake, averaging 6,000 tons of debris and trash each year. They also support programs in boater safety, water quality, hydrilla control, and other areas related to recreation and the environment.

In 2015, the Friends worked with the Boy Scouts' Blue Ridge Mountains Council to obtain approximately 400 tons (400,000 kg) of concrete debris for improved fish habitat at Claytor Lake. The debris was from a demolished spillway at the council's nearby Camp Powhatan. Also involved in the project were the Virginia Department of Game and Inland Fisheries, Pulaski County, and Appalachian Power.

New River Trail 

The New River Trail State Park, a rail trail that was built on top of an abandoned Norfolk Southern Railway right-of-way, follows part of the shoreline of Claytor Lake and crosses it on the Hiwassee Bridge. The  bridge was built in 1931 by the Virginia Bridge and Iron Co. of Roanoke, a subsidiary of the Norfolk and Western Railway.

Recreational activities 

Popular activities at Claytor Lake include powerboating, sailing and various watersports.

Fishing has also become a major attraction at Claytor Lake. The most plentiful fish in the lake are bluegill, a form of sunfish. Most commonly they are in the  range and weigh less than a pound. Catfish are also popular in Claytor Lake, some of them getting quite large (well over ). The main sporting varieties are largemouth bass, smallmouth bass and striped bass. All tournament fishing is catch and release and most is done by local clubs. Striped bass fishing occurs year-round with various techniques. The average "striper" (as they are commonly known) is about  but catches close to  have been reported.

Several high cliffs of shale rock ring the lake shoreline. This material is generally loose and unstable, and therefore climbing is not permitted.

The Blue Ridge Mountains Council of the Boy Scouts of America operates the Claytor Lake Aquatics Base on the shore of the lake. It offers sailing, rowing, and other watersports such as wakeboarding to the Boy Scouts who spend a week there during the summer. It also offers a program to earn a PADI scuba diving certification over the course of the week.

References

External links 
ClaytorLakeOnline.com
Claytor Lake State Park
Claytor Lake, Virginia Department of Game and Inland Fisheries
Friends of Claytor Lake
Claytor Lake Sailing Association
Claytor-Lake.net web portal

Reservoirs in Virginia
Protected areas of Pulaski County, Virginia
Bodies of water of Pulaski County, Virginia